Li Ling (born 7 February 1985) is a Chinese shot putter. Her personal best throw is 19.95 metres, set in Wiesbaden.

She initially finished fifth at the 2012 Summer Olympics in London, but was retroactively ranked third after Evgeniia Kolodko and the winner, Nadzeya Ostapchuk, was disqualified for failing a drug test. On 20 August 2016, the IOC announced Yevgeniya Kolodko, the Russian silver medalist of women's shot put at the 2012 Summer Olympics, failed anti-doping test, Li was thus awarded the Bronze medal.

International competitions

References

1985 births
Living people
Chinese female shot putters
Olympic athletes of China
Athletes (track and field) at the 2008 Summer Olympics
Athletes (track and field) at the 2012 Summer Olympics
Asian Games gold medalists for China
Asian Games medalists in athletics (track and field)
Athletes (track and field) at the 2006 Asian Games
Athletes (track and field) at the 2010 Asian Games
Medalists at the 2006 Asian Games
Medalists at the 2010 Asian Games
21st-century Chinese women